Krasnogvardeysky District may refer to:
Krasnogvardeysky District, Russia, several districts in Russia
Krasnohvardiiske Raion (Krasnogvardeysky District), a district in Crimea
Krasnohvardiiskyi District (Krasnogvardeysky District), until 2015, the name of Chechelivskyi District, a district of the city of Dnipropetrovsk in Dnipropetrovsk Oblast, Ukraine
Chervonohvardiyskyi Raion (Krasnogvardeysky District), a district of the city of Makiivka, Donetsk Oblast, Ukraine

See also
Krasnogvardeysky (disambiguation)

District name disambiguation pages